Scared to Dance is the debut studio album by Scottish punk rock band Skids. It was released on 23 February 1979 by record label Virgin.

Writing 

Anti-war themes are a recurring motif in the album. There are also a great deal of references in singer Richard Jobson's lyrics to the band's home region in Scotland.

Music and production 

Scared to Dance was produced by David Batchelor and engineered by Mick Glossop.

Scared to Dance was the first album to feature Stuart Adamson's 'bagpipe guitar', which would be the trademark of his later band Big Country.

Release 

The album was preceded by the single "Into the Valley", released on 16 February 1979, which reached No. 10 in the UK Singles Chart. Scared to Dance was released on 23 February, reaching No. 19 on the UK Albums Chart.

Reception 

Scared to Dance has been well received by critics. Ira Robbins of Trouser Press called the album "excellent [...] Using loud guitar and semi-martial drumming for its basis, Jobson's hearty singing sounds like an 18th century general leading his merry troops down from the hills into glorious battle."

Legacy 
The song "The Saints Are Coming" was later covered by Green Day and U2 and released as a charity single, reaching #1 in several countries.

"Into the Valley" became popular as adopted and sung by fans of Dunfermline Athletic F.C., the band's local football team, as well as Charlton Athletic F.C. in England whose ground is known as The Valley.

Scared To Dance is also the name of a club and gig night in London founded in 2009.

Track listing

Personnel 

 Skids

 Richard Jobson – vocals, guitar
 Stuart Adamson – guitar
 William Simpson – bass guitar
 Thomas Kellichan – drums

 Additional personnel

 David Batchelor – piano, production
 Chris Jenkins – guitar

 Technical personnel

 Mick Glossop – engineering
 Steve Prestage – engineering assistance
 Russell Mills – sleeve artwork
 Dennis Morris – sleeve photography

Charts

References

External links 

 

Skids (band) albums
1979 debut albums
Virgin Records albums
Albums with cover art by Russell Mills (artist)